Traditional Persian clothing can be seen in Persian miniature paintings, employ both vivid and muted colors for clothing, although the colors of paint pigment often do not match the colors of dyes.

The clothing of ancient Iran took an advanced form, and the fabric and color of clothing became very important. Depending on the social status, eminence, climate of the region and the season, Persian clothing during the Achaemenian period took various forms. The philosophy used in Persian clothing was that, in addition to being functional, it also had to be of aesthetic value.

Traditional Persian clothing, although seldom worn in urban areas in modern times, has been well preserved in texts and paintings throughout history.

Men's dress
The traditional men's garment included the Shalvar, and Jameh combination, often with a wide belt called Kamarband, from which English gets the word "cummerbund".

Headdresses were also worn by men in traditional wear, known as the Sarband. Long robes and loin cloths were also worn by both men and women. Usage of gold jewelry was common.

Gallery

See also
Central Asian clothing
Korymbos (headgear)
Gorjiduz
Kandys
Sasanian dress
Tocharian clothing
Zardozi
Clothing in ancient Greece

References

 Ancient Egyptian, Mesopotamian & Persian Costume (Dover Fashion and Costumes) – November 2, 2011
 پوشاک در ایران باستان، فریدون پوربهمن /ت: هاجر ضیاء سیکارودی
 Iran: 5000 Years of Clothing, Jewellery and Cosmetics -

External links

Books.google.com
Seasonsiran.com
Historical lexicon of Persian clothing
Ancient Persian Cloths in the Celebration of 2500 Years Persian Empire Anniversary, Persepolis, 1971 (Video)

 
Clothing
Middle Eastern clothing
Clothing by ethnicity